Mursalevo is a village in Kocherinovo Municipality, Kyustendil Province, south-western Bulgaria. As of 2013 it has 413 inhabitants. It is situated on the left bank of the Struma River at about 2 km north of the municipal centre Kocherinovo. 

The remains of a Neolithic village, estimated to be 8,000 years old, have been excavated nearby. The foundations of more than 60 houses have been discovered, some of them with two storeys.

Citations 

Villages in Kyustendil Province